Danilo Ezequiel Rinaldi (born 18 April 1986) is an Argentina-born Sammarinese footballer currently playing as a striker for Campionato Sammarinese side La Fiorita and San Marino national team.

Club career
Born in San Nicolás de los Arroyos in the province of Buenos Aires, Argentina, he started his career at a local clubs of lower leagues: Chacarita Juniors, Conesa FC, Deportivo Armenio, General Rojo UD and CSD La Emilia. In July 2008, at the invitation of his cousin Cristian Menín, Rinaldi moved to San Marino and joined Campionato Sammarinese side S.S. Virtus. In 2010 he returned to Argentina when he played for Conesa FC. He remained there until summer 2012 when he joined S.P. La Fiorita. In January 2014 he went on trial with four China League One clubs but was not offered a contract.

International career
Due to having Sanmarinese roots through his grandfather, Rinaldi became the subject of interest from the San Marino national team and applied for citizenship of the country. Shortly after confirming him as Sanmarinese citizen he received his first call-up from Giampaolo Mazza. Rinaldi made his debut for San Marino after coming on as a substitute for Matteo Vitaioli in the 88th minute, in a 0–3 defeat against Czech Republic on 19 November 2008. He has scored first international goal, a penalty in a friendly against Malta in a 2–3 home defeat.

International goals
Scores and results list San Marino's goal tally first, score column indicates score after each Rinaldi goal.

Personal life
Rinaldi is married to Magalí Vivas and has a son. He is a brother of Federico Rinaldi and cousin of Cristian Menín.

References

External links
 
 

1986 births
Living people
Sammarinese footballers
Association football forwards
San Marino international footballers
Argentine footballers
Sammarinese people of Argentine descent
Sportspeople of Argentine descent
Argentine people of Sammarinese descent
Chacarita Juniors footballers
Deportivo Armenio footballers
S.S. Virtus players
S.P. La Fiorita players
Campionato Sammarinese di Calcio players
People from San Nicolás de los Arroyos
Sportspeople from Buenos Aires Province